This is a list of wars involving the Republic of Niger.

References

 
Niger
Military history of Niger
Wars